Agrypnus is a genus of click beetle.

List of species

 Agrypnus aberdarensis (Fleutiaux, 1935)
 Agrypnus abstrusus Hayek, 1973
 Agrypnus abstrusus (Hayek, 1973)
 Agrypnus acervatus (Candèze, 1888)
 Agrypnus acristatus Vats & Kashyap, 1992
 Agrypnus aculeatus (Candèze, 1857)
 Agrypnus acuminipennis (Fairmaire, 1878)
 Agrypnus acutangulus (Fleutiaux, 1936)
 Agrypnus adelaidae (Blackburn, 1892)
 Agrypnus adeloceroides (Candèze, 1900)
 Agrypnus adustus (Elston, 1924)
 Agrypnus aequalis (Candèze, 1900)
 Agrypnus afflictus (Candèze, 1874)
 Agrypnus agrestis Vats & Kashyap, 1992
 Agrypnus akidiformis (Candèze, 1857)
 Agrypnus alberti Hayek, 1973
 Agrypnus albisparsus (Candèze, 1857)
 Agrypnus albitactus (Candèze, 1874)
 Agrypnus alboguttatus (W.J. Macleay, 1888)
 Agrypnus albopictus (Candèze, 1857)
 Agrypnus alboscutatus (Candèze, 1893)
 Agrypnus alboseminatus Kolbe
 Agrypnus alluaudi (Fleutiaux, 1934)
 Agrypnus alternans (W.J. Macleay, 1872)
 Agrypnus alternatus (Schwarz, 1902)
 Agrypnus amamianus (Kishii, 1974)
 Agrypnus amamiensis (Miwa, 1934)
 Agrypnus ami Kishii, 1995
 Agrypnus amplicollis (Boheman, 1851)
 Agrypnus anathesinus (Candèze, 1897)
 Agrypnus andersoni (Blackburn, 1892)
 Agrypnus angularis (Schwarz, 1903)
 Agrypnus angulicollis (Candèze, 1891)
 Agrypnus angustus (Fleutiaux, 1942)
 Agrypnus anili Punam, Saini & Vasu, 1997
 Agrypnus antiguus (Candèze, 1857)
 Agrypnus apiatus Hayek, 1979
 Agrypnus apodixus (Candèze, 1865)
 Agrypnus applanatus (Elston, 1924)
 Agrypnus aquilus (Elston, 1927)
 Agrypnus arbitrarius (Elston, 1924)
 Agrypnus arctior (Candèze, 1895)
 Agrypnus argentatus (Candèze, 1893)
 Agrypnus argentosquamus Vats & Kashyap, 1992
 Agrypnus argillaceus (Solsky, 1871)
 Agrypnus aristatus (Champion, 1894)
 Agrypnus armatus (Candèze, 1889)
 Agrypnus arorai Vats & Kashyap, 1992
 Agrypnus asper (Candèze, 1874)
 Agrypnus asperulatus (Candèze, 1878)
 Agrypnus assus (Candèze, 1857)
 Agrypnus aterrimus Girard, 1986
 Agrypnus atricolor (W.J. Macleay, 1888)
 Agrypnus babanus (Kishii, 1990)
 Agrypnus badeni (Candèze, 1878)
 Agrypnus badius (Elston, 1927)
 Agrypnus baibaranus (Hayek, 1973)
 Agrypnus bakeri (Fleutiaux, 1916)
 Agrypnus basalis (Fleutiaux, 1935)
 Agrypnus beccarii (Candèze, 1880)
 Agrypnus bellator (Elston, 1927)
 Agrypnus bengalensis Punam, Saini & Vasu, 1997
 Agrypnus benitensis (Hayek, 1973)
 Agrypnus bergeali (Girard, 1970)
 Agrypnus bidentatus (Fleutiaux, 1934)
 Agrypnus bidivisus (Candèze, 1874)
 Agrypnus bifasciatus (Schwarz, 1902)
 Agrypnus biforatus (Candèze, 1895)
 Agrypnus bigener (Elston, 1924)
 Agrypnus bigranosus (Schwarz, 1903)
 Agrypnus bilyi Cate, Platia & Schimmel, 2002
 Agrypnus bimaculatus (Schwarz, 1902)
 Agrypnus bimarginatus (Schwarz, 1908)
 Agrypnus binodulus (Motschulsky, 1861)
 Agrypnus binus (Candèze, 1889)
 Agrypnus bipapulatus (Candèze, 1865)
 Agrypnus bipunctatus (Schwarz, 1908)
 Agrypnus blackburni Hayek, 1973
 Agrypnus blairei (Fleutiaux, 1927)
 Agrypnus boomensis Vats & Kashyap, 1992
 Agrypnus borneoensis Ôhira, 1973
 Agrypnus brachychaetus (Kollar, 1844)
 Agrypnus brachypterus Hayek, 1979
 Agrypnus brevipennis (Schwarz, 1903)
 Agrypnus brevis (Candèze, 1857)
 Agrypnus brightensis (Blackburn, 1892)
 Agrypnus brunnipennis (Candèze, 1857)
 Agrypnus bullatus (Carter, 1939)
 Agrypnus buyssoni (Jagemann, 1944)
 Agrypnus caffer (Candèze, 1881)
 Agrypnus calamitosus (Candèze, 1874)
 Agrypnus caliginosus (Boisduval, 1835)
 Agrypnus campestris Vats & Kashyap, 1992
 Agrypnus candezei (Fleutiaux, 1894)
 Agrypnus canescens (Candèze, 1897)
 Agrypnus cariei (Fleutiaux, 1920)
 Agrypnus carinicollis (Schwarz, 1908)
 Agrypnus carinulatus (Candèze, 1857)
 Agrypnus cashmiriensis (Della Beffa, 1931)
 Agrypnus castaneipennis (Candèze, 1956)
 Agrypnus castaneus (Elston, 1927)
 Agrypnus castelnaui (Candèze, 1882)
 Agrypnus catatonus (Hayek, 1979)
 Agrypnus catatonus Hayek, 1979
 Agrypnus cervinus (Erichson, 1834)
 Agrypnus charcus Boheman
 Agrypnus cinctipes (Germar, 1840)
 Agrypnus cineraceus (Elston, 1927)
 Agrypnus cinerascens (Candèze, 1879)
 Agrypnus cinnamoneus (Candèze, 1874)
 Agrypnus cithareus (Candèze, 1893)
 Agrypnus claudinae Dolin & Girard, 2003
 Agrypnus coarctatus (Candèze, 1874)
 Agrypnus coctus (Candèze, 1874)
 Agrypnus coenosus (Hope, 1831)
 Agrypnus cognatus (Van Zwaluwenburg, 1957)
 Agrypnus collisus (Candèze, 1891)
 Agrypnus colonicus (Candèze, 1881)
 Agrypnus coloratus (Fleutiaux, 1934)
 Agrypnus communis (W.J. Macleay, 1888)
 Agrypnus commutabilis (Elston, 1924)
 Agrypnus compactus (Candèze, 1882)
 Agrypnus comptus (Candèze, 1874)
 Agrypnus concoloris Vats & Kashyap, 1992
 Agrypnus confertus Vats & Kashyap, 1992
 Agrypnus consobrinus (Candèze, 1857)
 Agrypnus conspiciendus (Elston, 1924)
 Agrypnus conspurcatus (Candèze, 1895)
 Agrypnus cordicollis (Candèze, 1865)
 Agrypnus cordipennis (Candèze, 1874)
 Agrypnus corvinus (Candèze, 1882)
 Agrypnus costicollis (Candèze, 1857)
 Agrypnus costipennis (Germar, 1848)
 Agrypnus couturieri Girard, 1986
 Agrypnus crassus (Candèze, 1874)
 Agrypnus crenatus (Kluge, 1833)
 Agrypnus crenicollis (Ménétriés, 1832)
 Agrypnus cruentatus (Elston, 1927)
 Agrypnus curtus (LeConte, 1853)
 Agrypnus cuspidatus (Kluge, 1833)
 Agrypnus cylindripennis (Fleutiaux, 1934)
 Agrypnus davidis (Fairmaire, 1878)
 Agrypnus dealbatus (Candèze, 1882)
 Agrypnus deboulayi (Candèze, 1874)
 Agrypnus decoratus (Candèze, 1882)
 Agrypnus decoratus (Schwarz, 1898)
 Agrypnus defectus (Candèze, 1888)
 Agrypnus denticollis (Fleutiaux, 1918)
 Agrypnus depressus (Candèze, 1874)
 Agrypnus desjardinsi (Candèze, 1857)
 Agrypnus deyrollei von Hayek, 1973
 Agrypnus dilaticollis (Fleutiaux, 1934)
 Agrypnus dilatipennis Kishii, 1995
 Agrypnus discedens (Candèze, 1878)
 Agrypnus divaricatus (Candèze, 1865)
 Agrypnus dorcinus (Candèze, 1875)
 Agrypnus dubius Candèze
 Agrypnus duplex (Blackburn, 1892)
 Agrypnus ellipticus (Candèze, 1857)
 Agrypnus elongatus (Carter, 1939)
 Agrypnus elstoni (Neboiss, 1956)
 Agrypnus eucalypti (Blackburn, 1892)
 Agrypnus eximius (Candèze, 1857)
 Agrypnus fairmairei (Candèze, 1889)
 Agrypnus fallax (Fairmaire, 1903)
 Agrypnus farinensis (Blackburn, 1900)
 Agrypnus farinosus (Candèze, 1895)
 Agrypnus fasciolatus (W.J. Macleay, 1888)
 Agrypnus fastigiatus (Schwarz, 1898)
 Agrypnus fatuus (Candèze, 1874)
 Agrypnus fenerivus (Fleutiaux, 1934)
 Agrypnus feralis (Candèze, 1891)
 Agrypnus fergusoni (Elston, 1927)
 Agrypnus ferrugineus (Candèze, 1874)
 Agrypnus ferruginipes (Fleutiaux, 1932)
 Agrypnus fex (Candèze, 1874)
 Agrypnus fibrinus (Candèze, 1865)
 Agrypnus fictus (Candèze, 1868)
 Agrypnus flavipes (Candeze)
 Agrypnus foedus (Candèze, 1857)
 Agrypnus formosanus (Bates, 1866)
 Agrypnus foveicollis (Cobos, 1970)
 Agrypnus frenchi Hayek, 1973
 Agrypnus froggatti (W.J. Macleay, 1888)
 Agrypnus fuliginosus (Candèze, 1865)
 Agrypnus fulvastra (Fleutiaux, 1940)
 Agrypnus fulvisparsus (Candèze, 1874)
 Agrypnus fuscoluridus Vats & Kashyap, 1992
 Agrypnus fuscus (Fabricius, 1801)
 Agrypnus gabonensis Hayek, 1973
 Agrypnus gazagnairei (Candèze, 1889)
 Agrypnus geminatus (Candèze, 1857)
 Agrypnus gibberiphorus Dolin & Girard, 2003
 Agrypnus gibberosus (Candèze, 1889)
 Agrypnus gibbosus (Schwarz, 1903)
 Agrypnus gibbus (Candèze, 1882)
 Agrypnus gilberti Dolin & Girard, 2003
 Agrypnus girardi (Hayek, 1979)
 Agrypnus glirinus (Candèze, 1865)
 Agrypnus goudoti (Candèze, 1857)
 Agrypnus gracilentus (Schwarz, 1902)
 Agrypnus gracilis (Blackburn, 1890)
 Agrypnus gracilis (Candèze, 1874)
 Agrypnus gragetensis (Szombathy, 1909)
 Agrypnus granulatus (W.J. Macleay, 1872)
 Agrypnus gressitti Ôhira, 1972
 Agrypnus griseopilosus (Fleutiaux, 1932)
 Agrypnus grisescens (Candèze, 1874)
 Agrypnus guineensis Girard, 2003
 Agrypnus guttatus (Candèze, 1857)
 Agrypnus gypsatus (Candèze, 1891)
 Agrypnus hackeri (Elston, 1927)
 Agrypnus haedulus (Candèze, 1857)
 Agrypnus hamatus (Candèze, 1893)
 Agrypnus hastatus (Candèze, 1857)
 Agrypnus haterumana (Ôhira, 1967)
 Agrypnus heianus Kishii, 1985
 Agrypnus herczigi Platia & Schimmel, 2007
 Agrypnus herzi (Koenig, 1887)
 Agrypnus hexagonus (Candèze, 1893)
 Agrypnus himalayanus (Jagemann, 1944)
 Agrypnus hispidulus (Candèze, 1857)
 Agrypnus holontelius Vats & Kashyap, 1992
 Agrypnus hottentota (Candèze, 1857)
 Agrypnus hova (Fleutiaux, 1903)
 Agrypnus humilis (Erichson, 1842)
 Agrypnus hydropictus (Fairmaire, 1880)
 Agrypnus hydropicus (Fairmaire, 1880)
 Agrypnus hypnicola (Kishii, 1964)
 Agrypnus illimis (Horn, 1894)
 Agrypnus impectinatus Vats & Kashyap, 1992
 Agrypnus impressicollis (Elston, 1924)
 Agrypnus impressus (Candèze, 1878)
 Agrypnus inaequalis (Fleutiaux, 1934)
 Agrypnus incertus (Fleutiaux, 1927)
 Agrypnus incultus (W.J. Macleay, 1888)
 Agrypnus incurvatus (Fleutiaux, 1927)
 Agrypnus indianus Punam, Saini & Vasu, 1997
 Agrypnus indosinensis (Fleutiaux, 1927)
 Agrypnus inductus (Candèze, 1888)
 Agrypnus industissimus (Candèze, 1892)
 Agrypnus inlustris Vats & Kashyap, 1992
 Agrypnus inops (Candèze, 1874)
 Agrypnus insularis (Candèze, 1874)
 Agrypnus insulsus (Candèze, 1895)
 Agrypnus intermedius (Schwarz, 1902)
 Agrypnus interpunctatus (Kluge, 1833)
 Agrypnus irroratus (Kluge, 1833)
 Agrypnus jacksoni Vats & Kashyap, 1992
 Agrypnus jagemanni Jiang, 1993
 Agrypnus jansoni (Fairmaire, 1871)
 Agrypnus judex (Candèze, 1874)
 Agrypnus jurulosus (Candèze, 1889)
 Agrypnus kawamurae (Miwa, 1929)
 Agrypnus kenyensis (Fleutiaux, 1919)
 Agrypnus kinangopa (Fleutiaux, 1935)
 Agrypnus korotjaevi (Gurjeva, 1987)
 Agrypnus kuluensis Vats & Kashyap, 1992
 Agrypnus kumayuni Punam, Saini & Vasu, 1997
 Agrypnus kusuii Ôhira, 1993
 Agrypnus labiosus (Candèze, 1874)
 Agrypnus lacrymosus (Candèze, 1874)
 Agrypnus lakhoni (Hayek, 1973)
 Agrypnus lameyi (Fleutiaux, 1927)
 Agrypnus lamottei Girard, 1991
 Agrypnus lapideus (Candèze, 1857)
 Agrypnus lateralis (Schwarz, 1903)
 Agrypnus laticollis (Candèze, 1857)
 Agrypnus latissimus Dolin & Girard, 2003
 Agrypnus latiusculus (Candèze, 1878)
 Agrypnus latus (Candèze, 1857)
 Agrypnus lavaudeni (Fleutiaux, 1932)
 Agrypnus laxatus (Candèze, 1895)
 Agrypnus lecordieri (Girard, 1971)
 Agrypnus leprosus (Candèze, 1857)
 Agrypnus leucaspis (Candèze, 1874)
 Agrypnus lezeleuci (Candèze, 1857)
 Agrypnus limonius Girard, 1991
 Agrypnus limosus (Candèze, 1881)
 Agrypnus lindensis (Blackburn, 1892)
 Agrypnus lineatellus (W.J. Macleay, 1888)
 Agrypnus lineatus (Candèze, 1897)
 Agrypnus litigiosus (Candèze, 1874)
 Agrypnus liukueiensis Kishii, 1990
 Agrypnus lolodorfensis Hayek, 1973
 Agrypnus longicollis (Heller, 1914)
 Agrypnus longicornis (Fleutiaux, 1934)
 Agrypnus longipennis (Schwarz, 1899)
 Agrypnus longus (Fleutiaux, 1902)
 Agrypnus lopezi (Fleutiaux, 1934)
 Agrypnus lucidus Vats & Kashyap, 1992
 Agrypnus luctus (Fleutiaux, 1935)
 Agrypnus lupinosus (Candèze, 1857)
 Agrypnus lutosus (Candèze, 1857)
 Agrypnus macgregori (Fleutiaux, 1934)
 Agrypnus macleayi (Candèze, 1882)
 Agrypnus macroderus (Candèze, 1865)
 Agrypnus maculipennis (Schwarz, 1903)
 Agrypnus maculosus (Candèze, 1874)
 Agrypnus madecassus (Fleutiaux, 1932)
 Agrypnus maisus Vats & Kashyap, 1992
 Agrypnus major (Candèze, 1857)
 Agrypnus mamillatus (Candèze, 1857)
 Agrypnus mansuetus (Blackburn, 1892)
 Agrypnus marginatus (Candèze, 1874)
 Agrypnus marginipennis (Schwarz, 1903)
 Agrypnus marmoratus (Candèze, 1874)
 Agrypnus meridionalis (Fleutiaux, 1934)
 Agrypnus mikawaenis Ôhira, 1986
 Agrypnus minicephalus (Ôhira, 1970)
 Agrypnus minimus (Candèze, 1895)
 Agrypnus minor (Candèze, 1857)
 Agrypnus minutus (Schwarz, 1898)
 Agrypnus miser (Schwarz, 1905)
 Agrypnus miyakei Ôhira, 1967
 Agrypnus miyamotoi (Nakane & Kishii, 1955)
 Agrypnus mjobergi (Elston, 1930)
 Agrypnus mocquerysi (Fleutiaux, 1932)
 Agrypnus modestus (Candèze, 1857)
 Agrypnus mohanensis Vats & Kashyap, 1992
 Agrypnus molardi Girard, 2003
 Agrypnus molitor (Candèze, 1875)
 Agrypnus monachus (Candèze, 1882)
 Agrypnus montanus (Miwa, 1929)
 Agrypnus montisnimbae Girard, 1991
 Agrypnus morosus (Candèze, 1895)
 Agrypnus mozambicanus (Fleutiaux, 1932)
 Agrypnus mucoreus (Candèze, 1857)
 Agrypnus multipunctatus (Elston, 1927)
 Agrypnus murinus (Linnaeus, 1758)
 Agrypnus murrayensis (Blackburn, 1892)
 Agrypnus muscerda (Candèze, 1874)
 Agrypnus muscroides Kishii, 1995
 Agrypnus musculus (Candèze, 1857)
 Agrypnus mustellinus (Germar, 1840)
 Agrypnus muticus (Herbst, 1806)
 Agrypnus mysticus (Candèze, 1857)
 Agrypnus nagaoi (Ôhira, 1966)
 Agrypnus ngokoensis (Hayek, 1973)
 Agrypnus niger (Schwarz, 1905)
 Agrypnus nigrescens (W.J. Macleay, 1888)
 Agrypnus nigritus (Candèze, 1857)
 Agrypnus nivalis (Fleutiaux, 1934)
 Agrypnus nodicollis (Candèze, 1857)
 Agrypnus nodieri (Fleutiaux, 1934)
 Agrypnus nodifer (Kluge, 1833)
 Agrypnus nubilus (Candèze, 1857)
 Agrypnus obscurus (Fleutiaux, 1934)
 Agrypnus occidentalis Girard, 2003
 Agrypnus octavus (Candèze, 1874)
 Agrypnus oinodon Wurst, Schimmel & Platia, 2001
 Agrypnus omanensis Platia & Schimmel, 1997
 Agrypnus opacus (Candèze, 1900)
 Agrypnus orientalis Hope, 1843
 Agrypnus ornatellus (Candèze, 1889)
 Agrypnus ornatus (Candèze, 1857)
 Agrypnus orthoderus (Elston, 1924)
 Agrypnus oshimanus Ôhira, 1969
 Agrypnus paenulatus (Boheman, 1851)
 Agrypnus paleatus (Champion, 1894)
 Agrypnus palliatus (Candèze, 1893)
 Agrypnus palliditarsis (Candèze, 1857)
 Agrypnus pallidus (Candèze, 1887)
 Agrypnus palpalis (Candèze, 1882)
 Agrypnus pantherinus (Fleutiaux, 1934)
 Agrypnus parallelicollis (Candèze, 1857)
 Agrypnus parallelus (Candèze, 1874)
 Agrypnus parcus (Schwarz, 1903)
 Agrypnus pardalinus (Candèze, 1882)
 Agrypnus parviceps (Gyllenhal, 1817)
 Agrypnus parvulus (W.J. Macleay, 1888)
 Agrypnus parvus (Fleutiaux, 1934)
 Agrypnus pauliani (Fleutiaux, 1941)
 Agrypnus pauliani (Girard, 1970)
 Agrypnus pauper (Candèze, 1878)
 Agrypnus pecirkai (Jagemann, 1944)
 Agrypnus perplexus (Elston, 1924)
 Agrypnus pictilis (Schwarz, 1899)
 Agrypnus pictipennis (Candèze, 1857)
 Agrypnus pictiventris (Candèze, 1857)
 Agrypnus pictus (Candèze, 1878)
 Agrypnus pinguis (Candèze, 1893)
 Agrypnus pipitzi (Candèze, 1889)
 Agrypnus plagiatus (Candèze, 1878)
 Agrypnus planatus (Candèze, 1895)
 Agrypnus planocorpus Vats & Kashyap, 1992
 Agrypnus plantaferusus Vats & Kashyap, 1992
 Agrypnus planus Vats & Kashyap, 1992
 Agrypnus pleureticus (Candèze, 1874)
 Agrypnus polishaensis Ôhira, 1977
 Agrypnus porcinus (Candèze, 1857)
 Agrypnus porosus (Kluge, 1835)
 Agrypnus porrectus (Fleutiaux, 1934)
 Agrypnus porriginosus (Candèze, 1874)
 Agrypnus praelongus (Elston, 1927)
 Agrypnus praetextus (Fleutiaux, 1934)
 Agrypnus pretoriensis (Cobos, 1966)
 Agrypnus princeps (Candèze, 1874)
 Agrypnus procellosus (Candèze, 1895)
 Agrypnus productus (Elston, 1924)
 Agrypnus proximus (Fleutiaux, 1934)
 Agrypnus pujoli (Girard, 1969)
 Agrypnus pulvereus (Candèze, 1889)
 Agrypnus punctatissimus (Elston, 1927)
 Agrypnus punctipennis (Candèze, 1874)
 Agrypnus pupillus (Candèze, 1892)
 Agrypnus quadricollis (Fairmaire, 1903)
 Agrypnus quadrinotatus (Schwarz, 1908)
 Agrypnus quedenfeldti Hayek, 1973
 Agrypnus rajasthanensis Vats & Kashyap, 1992
 Agrypnus rameshi Vats & Kashyap, 1992
 Agrypnus rectangularis (Say, 1825)
 Agrypnus rectangulus (Schwarz, 1903)
 Agrypnus recticollis (Elston, 1930)
 Agrypnus reductus (Candèze, 1878)
 Agrypnus repercussus Vats & Kashyap, 1992
 Agrypnus reticulatus (Elston, 1930)
 Agrypnus robustus (Schwarz, 1903)
 Agrypnus rohanchaboti (Fleutiaux, 1922)
 Agrypnus rubescens (W.J. Macleay, 1888)
 Agrypnus rubicundulus (W.J. Macleay, 1888)
 Agrypnus rubiginosus (Candèze, 1882)
 Agrypnus rufopiceus (W.J. Macleay, 1888)
 Agrypnus rufulus (Elston, 1927)
 Agrypnus rufus (Blackburn, 1890)
 Agrypnus rugatus (Candèze, 1857)
 Agrypnus rugosus (Fleutiaux, 1934)
 Agrypnus rusticus (Candèze, 1893)
 Agrypnus ryukyuensis Kishii, 1985
 Agrypnus sakaguchii (Miwa, 1928)
 Agrypnus sakishimanus Ôhira, 1967
 Agrypnus saltatus Vats & Kashyap, 1992
 Agrypnus samburensis (Fleutiaux, 1919)
 Agrypnus sarikamisensis Platia, Yildirim & Kesdek, 2007
 Agrypnus sauteri (Ôhira, 1970)
 Agrypnus scaber (Candèze, 1857)
 Agrypnus scarrosus (Candèze, 1857)
 Agrypnus schwaneri (Candèze, 1874)
 Agrypnus schwarzi (Schenkling, 1925)
 Agrypnus scopulosus (Elston, 1924)
 Agrypnus scopus (Schwarz, 1902)
 Agrypnus scrofa (Candèze, 1873)
 Agrypnus sculptus (Candèze, 1874)
 Agrypnus scutellaris (Candèze, 1895)
 Agrypnus scutellatus (Candèze, 1857)
 Agrypnus semivestitus (Elston, 1927)
 Agrypnus senilis (Peringuey, 1892)
 Agrypnus septentrionalis (Fleutiaux, 1934)
 Agrypnus serricollis (Candèze, 1857)
 Agrypnus serrula (Candèze, 1857)
 Agrypnus setiger (Bates, 1866)
 Agrypnus setigerus (Bates, 1866)
 Agrypnus setosus (Schwarz, 1902)
 Agrypnus setulosus (Candèze, 1882)
 Agrypnus seyrigi (Fleutiaux, 1934)
 Agrypnus shirakii (Matsumura, 1910)
 Agrypnus silvaticus (Fleutiaux, 1932)
 Agrypnus silvicola Girard, 2003
 Agrypnus similis (Fleutiaux, 1934)
 Agrypnus simplex (Candèze, 1874)
 Agrypnus sinensis (Candèze, 1857)
 Agrypnus singularis (Fleutiaux, 1919)
 Agrypnus sinuatus (Candèze, 1857)
 Agrypnus sjostedti (Schwarz, 1908)
 Agrypnus socius (Candèze, 1874)
 Agrypnus solanensis Vats & Kashyap, 1992
 Agrypnus soleatus (Schwarz, 1857)
 Agrypnus sordidus (Candeze)
 Agrypnus souslapisus Vats & Kashyap, 1992
 Agrypnus spinaparamerus Vats & Kashyap, 1992
 Agrypnus spinifer (Candèze, 1889)
 Agrypnus spissicollis (Candèze, 1893)
 Agrypnus spretus (Candèze, 1882)
 Agrypnus squalescens (Fairmaire, 1871)
 Agrypnus squalidus (Fleutiaux, 1927)
 Agrypnus squamafraxineus Vats & Kashyap, 1992
 Agrypnus squameus (Szombathy, 1909)
 Agrypnus sternoviridis Vats & Kashyap, 1992
 Agrypnus stictus (Candèze, 1895)
 Agrypnus stigmosus (Elston, 1927)
 Agrypnus striatulus Vats & Kashyap, 1992
 Agrypnus stricticollis (Fairmaire, 1881)
 Agrypnus suarezi Hayek, 1973
 Agrypnus subargillus Vats & Kashyap, 1992
 Agrypnus subcarinulatus (Schwarz, 1908)
 Agrypnus subcervinus (Fleutiaux, 1916)
 Agrypnus subcompactus (Elston, 1927)
 Agrypnus subcylindricus (Schwarz, 1908)
 Agrypnus subfaenum Vats & Kashyap, 1992
 Agrypnus sublapideus Vats & Kashyap, 1992
 Agrypnus submarmoratus (Elston, 1924)
 Agrypnus subocellatus (Candèze, 1882)
 Agrypnus suboculatus (Candèze, 1882)
 Agrypnus subreductus (Girard, 1971)
 Agrypnus subsericeus (Candèze, 1878)
 Agrypnus subserratus (Quedenfeldt, 1886)
 Agrypnus substramentum Vats & Kashyap, 1992
 Agrypnus substriatus (Fleutiaux, 1934)
 Agrypnus subsulcatus Candèze, 1891
 Agrypnus subtilis (W.J. Macleay, 1888)
 Agrypnus subtuberculatus (Schwarz, 1898)
 Agrypnus suillus (Candèze, 1857)
 Agrypnus sulcicollis (Schwarz, 1908)
 Agrypnus taciturnus (Candèze, 1874)
 Agrypnus tactus (Candèze, 1874)
 Agrypnus taiwanus (Miwa, 1927)
 Agrypnus takasago Kishii, 1990
 Agrypnus tectus (Fleutiaux, 1935)
 Agrypnus tellinii (Fleutiaux, 1903)
 Agrypnus terminatus (Fleutiaux, 1934)
 Agrypnus testaceus (Schwarz, 1908)
 Agrypnus thibetanus (Reitter, 1913)
 Agrypnus thomasi Hayek, 1973
 Agrypnus thuligadensis Vats & Kashyap, 1992
 Agrypnus tigrinus (Fleutiaux, 1919)
 Agrypnus tonkinensis (Fleutiaux, 1927)
 Agrypnus torrefactus (Candèze, 1857)
 Agrypnus torresi (Candèze, 1897)
 Agrypnus tostus (Candèze, 1857)
 Agrypnus transversicollis (Fleutiaux, 1927)
 Agrypnus transversus (Candèze, 1857)
 Agrypnus triangularis (Schwarz, 1903)
 Agrypnus tripartitus (Candèze, 1874)
 Agrypnus triplehornorum (Knull, 1973)
 Agrypnus triticumunis Vats & Kashyap, 1992
 Agrypnus truncatus (Herbst, 1806)
 Agrypnus truquii (Candèze, 1874)
 Agrypnus tsukamotoi (Kishii, 1956)
 Agrypnus tsushimensis Ôhira, 1986
 Agrypnus tuberculatus (Candèze, 1874)
 Agrypnus tuberculipennis (Miwa, 1929)
 Agrypnus tuberculosus Vats & Kashyap, 1992
 Agrypnus tuberosus Vats & Kashyap, 1992
 Agrypnus turbidus (Germar, 1840)
 Agrypnus turkestanicus (Schwarz, 1902)
 Agrypnus tuspanensis (Candèze, 1857)
 Agrypnus uncatus (Hayek, 1979)
 Agrypnus unicolor (Hope, 1838)
 Agrypnus unicus (Fleutiaux, 1919)
 Agrypnus upadhyai Vats & Kashyap, 1992
 Agrypnus uraiensis (Miwa, 1929)
 Agrypnus ursulus (Candèze, 1857)
 Agrypnus validus (Elston, 1924)
 Agrypnus vandepolli (Candèze, 1887)
 Agrypnus variabilis (Candèze, 1857)
 Agrypnus variabilis Candèze, 1857
 Agrypnus variolus (Candèze, 1874)
 Agrypnus vatsai Vats & Kashyap, 1992
 Agrypnus venustus Girard, 1991
 Agrypnus versicolor (Fleutiaux, 1932)
 Agrypnus vestitus (Kluge, 1833)
 Agrypnus vicinus (Fleutiaux, 1919)
 Agrypnus victoriae (Candèze, 1865)
 Agrypnus viettei (Girard, 1970)
 Agrypnus vitalisi (Fleutiaux, 1918)
 Agrypnus wallacei (Candèze, 1874)
 Agrypnus yuppe (Kishii, 1964)
 Agrypnus zanzibaricus Hayek, 1973
 Agrypnus zietzi (Blackburn, 1895)

References

External links
 Ecowatch: Agrypnus species (click beetle)
 Biolib

Elateridae genera